The Bottoms is an Edgar Award-winning suspense novel by American author Joe R. Lansdale.

Plot summary
This story takes place during the Great Depression in East Texas. Young Harry Crane discovers the mutilated body of a black woman that sets off a mystery involving rising violence and racism. Despite the efforts of law enforcement, the killing continues. Harry and his younger sister, Thomasina, fix their suspicions on a local horror legend, The Goat Man, who lives deep in the Big Thicket. Together they set out to solve the mystery of who the real killer is.

Awards
The 2001 Edgar Award for best novel.  
A New York Times Notable Book of the Year (2000) 
The 2000 Herodotus Award for The First US Historical Novel
A 2000 Dashiell Hammett Award for "Best Novel" (nominated)
The 2001 Mystery Readers International's Macavity Awards for best mystery novel. (nominated)

Editions

This book was published as lettered edition and a  limited edition by Subterranean Press and as a trade hardcover by Mysterious Press. It was re-issued as a trade paperback by Vintage Crime/Black Lizard Publications on 7 December 2010. As of August 2012, all hardcover editions are out of print.

Film adaptation
As of 2014 the book was being co-produced for a film by Joe R. Lansdale, Bill Paxton, and Brad Wyman. Paxton died in 2017, making any further plans uncertain.

References

External links
Author's Official Website
Publisher's Website
  Vintage Crime/Black Lizard Website

Novels by Joe R. Lansdale
Great Depression novels
American mystery novels
Novels set in Texas
Edgar Award-winning works
2000 American novels
Works by Joe R. Lansdale
Subterranean Press books